Karaali is a village in the Baskil District of Elazığ Province in Turkey. The village is populated by Kurds of the Parçikan tribe and had a population of 268 in 2021.

The hamlets of Buğular, Çakıllı, Çayırcık, Çitiluşağı, Dutluköy, Şimşeklir, Tekeli and Yoncalı are attached to the village.

History 
In June 2009, a 50 year-old mentally unstable villager killed six other inhabitants of the village aging from 12 to 80 years old with his shotgun.

The State Hydraulic Works agreed to build a irrigation pond near the village in March 2021. In August 2021, the Ministry of Agriculture and Forestry started to plant trees near the village, which is expected to form a forest of over 300 ha.

References

Villages in Baskil District
Kurdish settlements in Elazığ Province